The Society of the Revival of Islamic Heritage (RIHS) is a Kuwait-based NGO with branches in a number of countries.

Spain
According to the Spanish intelligence agency CNI, Kuwait provided funding and aid to Islamic associations and congregations in Spain through its subsidiary branch of RIHS. Kuwait this way funded mosques in Reus and Torredembarra who spread an ideology contrary to the integration of Muslims into Spanish society and fostering hatred of non-Muslims.

Pakistan and Afghanistan branches

Corruption and terrorism
The branches in Pakistan and Afghanistan allegedly became corrupted by members of al-Qaeda; those two branches were embargoed on 9 January 2002 by the United States. The government of Russia has banned RIHS from operating anywhere in Russia and has deemed the society to be a terrorist organisation.

A release from the Treasury's Press Office alleged that the Pakistan office, under the direction of Abd al-Muhsin al-Libi, had inflated the number of orphans under its care.

The United States has the organization listed on the OFAC SDN list (as Administration of the Revival of Islamic Heritage Society Committee), thus prohibiting U.S. citizens and permanent residents from doing business with the organization.

Guantanamo captives whose continued detention was justified through connection to RIHS
The continued detention of several Guantanamo captives has been justified, in part, through their association with the Revival of Islamic Heritage Society.

References

Charities based in Kuwait
Islamic organizations based in Kuwait
Organizations designated as terrorist by Russia
Organizations designated as terrorist by the United States